Krystyna Czajkowska-Rawska (born 25 April 1936) is a former female Polish volleyball player, a member of Poland women's national volleyball team in 1955–1968, a bronze medalist of the Olympic Games (Tokyo 1964, Mexico 1968), a bronze medalist of the World Championship 1962 and medalist of the European Championship (silver in 1963 and 1967, bronze in 1958), eight-time Polish Champion, head coach.

External links
Sylwetka w serwisie PKOl

1936 births
Living people
People from Sosnowiec
Sportspeople from Silesian Voivodeship
Polish women's volleyball players
Olympic volleyball players of Poland
Volleyball players at the 1964 Summer Olympics
Volleyball players at the 1968 Summer Olympics
Olympic bronze medalists for Poland
Olympic medalists in volleyball
Medalists at the 1968 Summer Olympics
Medalists at the 1964 Summer Olympics